The Polikarpov TB-2 was a Soviet heavy bomber prototype designed and tested in the 1920s. It was a sesquiplane of wooden construction, with engines mounted on the bottom wing. Work on the sole prototype began in 1927 and it was tested in 1930. Although TB-2 performance was superior to that of the Tupolev TB-1 in service at the time, it was deemed insufficient for 1930 and the project was abandoned.

Specifications (TB-2)

References

1920s Soviet and Russian bomber aircraft
TB-2
Sesquiplanes
Aircraft first flown in 1930
Twin-engined tractor aircraft